Federica Ferracuti (born 11 April 1994), known professionally as Hu, is an Italian singer-songwriter, musician and record producer.

Biography
Ferracuti was born in Fermo and learned to play guitar at a young age, especially jazz music. She graduated in sound design at the Conservatorio Rossini in Pesaro, and started writing her own music under the pseudonym of "Hu", after the Ancient Egyptian god of the same name.

During her early music career, she composed advertising songs for several brands, including Lamborghini and Jägermeister, and for the 2018 summer collection of Chiara Ferragni. In 2020, she made it into the finals of Sanremo Giovani with her song "Occhi Niagara", but did not manage to qualify for the "Newcomers" section of the Sanremo Music Festival 2021.

She participated alongside Highsnob at the Sanremo Music Festival 2022, with the song "Abbi cura di te".

Discography

Studio albums 
 Numeri primi (2022)

Singles 
 "Neon" (2020)
 "Occhi Niagara" (2020)
 "End"  (2021)
 "Millemila" (2021)
 "Abbi cura di te"  (2022)
 "Avec moi" (2022)

References

Italian women singer-songwriters
Living people
21st-century Italian women singers
1994 births
People from Fermo